Fyodor Shutov (born 10 February 1986) is a Russian long-distance runner. In 2019, he competed in the men's marathon at the 2019 World Athletics Championships held in Doha, Qatar. He finished in 35th place with a time of 2:18:58.

References

External links 
 

Living people
1986 births
Place of birth missing (living people)
Russian male long-distance runners
Russian male marathon runners
Authorised Neutral Athletes at the World Athletics Championships
Russian Athletics Championships winners